Dicerca pugionata, also known as the witch-hazel borer, is a species of buprestid beetle from the Chrysochroinae subfamily that occurs in the Eastern North America. Its food includes witch-hazel species including Hamamelis virginiana in mid July. It also feeds on ninebark and alder species.

Dicerca pugionata measure  in length.

References

External links
Image of Dicerca pugionata on BugGuide

Further reading
Solomon, J.D. 1995. Guide to insect borers in North American broadleaf trees and shrubs. USDA Forest Service Agriculture Handbook AH-706. 735 pp.

Buprestidae
Beetles of North America
Beetles described in 1824
Taxa named by Ernst Friedrich Germar